Oliver Cookson is an English entrepreneur who established the sports nutrition business Myprotein, which he sold in 2011 for £58 million to The Hut Group. He was named in the Sunday Times Rich List 2019 having recorded a net worth of £306 m.

Early life 
Oliver Cookson is a British entrepreneur, who grew up in Withington, Manchester, in the Northwest of England, and comes from a working-class background. After leaving school with one GCSE, he was taken on as an apprentice for an IT company before setting up on his own as a self-taught contract website developer for major global organisations.

Career

Myprotein 
Cookson, a keen weight trainer, applied his knowledge of web development to launch sports nutrition brand Myprotein in 2004 with just a £500 overdraft. He began trading from a lock-up garage and built Myprotein into a multi-million-pound business employing more than fifty staff and selling products across the UK and Europe.

The company manufactures and sells sports nutrition products and protein foods through its website and became the market leader in the segment.

Products include protein powders, amino acids, vitamins, ready-to-drink products, omega oils and other items to help people build muscle, lose weight and supplement their diets. Celebrities who use Myprotein products include Rugby players Kyle Eastmond and Dan Hipkiss, sprinter Craig Pickering and multiple footballers.

The Hut Group
In 2011, Cookson sold Myprotein to The Hut Group in a deal worth £58 million in cash plus shares in the group. Those shares earned him another estimated £283 million when The Hut Group debuted on the stock market with the biggest initial public offering (IPO) of the year in 2020.

Later career 
On 1 November 2011, Cookson established the business Monocore launching multiple consumer nutrition brands, including GoNutrition, before fully exiting the company in 2019.

He then founded investment vehicle OSC Group according to Companies House.

Make-A-Wish (UK) 
In November 2020, Cookson became a patron for the charity Make-A-Wish (UK), which raises funds to help the wishes of critically ill children come true. The charity had been severely impacted by the Covid-19 pandemic, which prevented them from raising funds via the usual channels such as marathon runs and made it difficult to deliver wishes due to pandemic restrictions. Cookson donated £250,000 to the charity, which was used to help one hundred critically ill children and give them hope for the future.

TV piracy 

In 2001, Cookson was fined £600 and ordered to complete 200 hours community service after pleading guilty to incitement under the Computer Misuse Act 1990, having  discovered a system which allowed viewers to see pay-per-view channels for free.

Litigation with The Hut Group 
Oliver Cookson was involved in a long running case of litigation with The Hut Group over the sale of Myprotein in 2011 and the valuations that each side had put on their business. Following a trial in The High Court in London in October 2014, Mr Justice William Blair, the brother of former Prime Minister Tony Blair, awarded Cookson net £6,482,911 million in relation to the counterclaim. The Hut Group made the first litigious move with what Mr Justice William Blair called "by way of pre-emptive strike".

Mr Justice Blair ordered that The Hut Group should pay its own costs and meet one third of those incurred by Cookson and the Trust.

In 2019, Cookson brought High Court documents alleging new shares in The Hut Group were issued to investors without Cookson's approval after the co-sale rights were removed, reducing Cookson's shareholding from 11.6% to 8.3% between February 2016 and May 2018.

References 

Living people
English company founders
Year of birth missing (living people)